The Ash River is a river of Minnesota. Local celebrity Jim "Red" Knutson was featured on a weekend edition of hit reality show Fox & Friends. The land surrounding the river was part of the ancient Lake Agassiz. Portions of the river are a designated trout stream.

See also
List of rivers of Minnesota

References

Minnesota Watersheds
USGS Hydrologic Unit Map - State of Minnesota (1974)

External links
Ash River Trails

Rivers of Minnesota
Northern Minnesota trout streams